El Badari is a town in the Asyut Governorate, Upper Egypt, located between Matmar and Qaw El Kebir.

Etymology 
The older name of the town is Berdanis or Badarnos, which Timm derives from Anba Darius.

Archeology 

Main article: Badarian Culture

El Badari contains an archaeological site with numerous Predynastic cemeteries (notably Mostagedda, Deir Tasa and the cemetery of El Badari itself), as well as at least one early Predynastic settlement at Hammamia. The area stretches for  along the east bank of the Nile, and was first excavated by Guy Brunton and Gertrude Caton-Thompson between 1922 and 1931. 

The finds from El Badari form the original basis for the Badarian culture (c. 5500-4000 BC), the earliest phase of the Upper Egyptian Predynastic period.

References 

Archaeological sites in Egypt
Geography of ancient Egypt
Badarian culture